SHOP.CA is a Canadian coupons and savings website.

Overview
Founded in 2011, SHOP.CA originally allowed approved partners to list and sell products on their website for customers to purchase. SHOP.CA had about 15 million different SKUs on its website. The company was recently acquired by Canadian Private Equity firm EMERGE Commerce Inc. for an undisclosed amount and continues to operate under the Shop.ca banner in Canada. Shop.ca has been re-positioned away from an e-commerce marketplace towards a "content & coupons destination". EMERGE Commerce Inc. is managed by Ghassan Halazon (CEO). The group's shareholders include a number of institutional and high net worth investors.

References

Online retailers of Canada
Retail companies established in 2011
Internet properties established in 2011
Reward websites